Graham Holdings Company (formerly The Washington Post Company) is a diversified American conglomerate holding company. Headquartered in Arlington County, Virginia, and incorporated in Delaware, it was formerly the owner of The Washington Post newspaper and Newsweek magazine.

Its current holdings include the digital marketing company SocialCode, the online magazine Slate, Graham Media Group (formerly Post-Newsweek Stations), a group of seven television stations, higher education company Kaplan, content and marketplace company Leaf Group, and the now-defunct Trove (formerly WaPo Labs)—the developers of a news reader app. Graham Holdings Company also owned cable television and internet service provider Cable One until it was spun off in 2015.

Corporate history
The history of Graham Holdings Company dates back to 1877, when the Post was first published. The Washington Post Company was incorporated in the District of Columbia in 1889, and remained a District of Columbia corporation until it changed its place of incorporation to Delaware in 2003. It is a public company and its Class B common stock trades on the New York Stock Exchange under the ticker symbol GHC; it went public in 1971.

Descendants of the late Eugene Meyer (including Chairman Donald E. Graham, his sister Lally Weymouth, and the beneficiaries of various family trusts) collectively control the company through their ownership of the unlisted Class A common stock that selects 70% of the company's board of directors. As of 2014, it forms more than 90% of the family's assets. Prior to 2014, Berkshire Hathaway was a substantial holder of the public Class B common stock that selects 30% of the company's board of directors, but exchanged most of that stock for WPLG-TV, one of Graham Holdings' television stations, and other assets, in 2014.

Since 1950, the company had been based in the Washington Post building in Washington, D.C., which was sold off separately in 2014. Its new headquarters are at 1300 North 17th Street in Arlington, Virginia, with the choice of state motivated (according to Don Graham) by the proximity to Congress and the fact that two of the holding's activity areas, education and health care, are subject to federal regulation.

On August 5, 2013, it was announced that the Washington Post Company would sell the flagship newspaper for $250 million to Jeff Bezos, founder and chief executive of Amazon.com. The Washington Post Company agreed to adopt a new corporate name once the sale was finalized. It adopted Graham Holdings Company as the new name effective November 29, 2013. Amazon.com was not involved in the sale. Nash Holdings LLC, a company owned by Bezos, closed the purchase of the newspaper and affiliated publications on October 1, 2013. Graham Holdings Company retained ownership of WaPo Labs, its technology innovation group, since rebranded as Trove.

In 2014, Tim O'Shaughnessy, founder of LivingSocial and a son-in-law of CEO Don Graham, joined GHC as president. O'Shaughnessy became CEO in November 2015.

In November 2014, Graham Holdings said it would spin off Cable ONE as a separate, publicly traded company in 2015.  The spin-off was completed on July 1, 2015.

In March 2018, following several years of enrollment decline, Graham sold Kaplan University to the Purdue University system, and it was rebranded Purdue University Global.

In June 2021, Graham Holdings completed their acquisition of Leaf Group, a consumer internet company, at a valuation of approximately $323 million.

Holdings

Broadcasting

Through its Graham Media Group subsidiary (formerly Post-Newsweek Stations), Graham Holdings owns a group of seven television stations. Led by chief executive officer Emily L. Barr, the company is now based in Chicago, after being co-located for several years with its local NBC affiliate WDIV-TV in Detroit.

Stations are arranged in alphabetical order by state and city of license.

Interactive
Graham Holdings Company also owns three firms active in various capacities on the World Wide Web. These include The Slate Group, which publishes Slate, Slate V, and ForeignPolicy.com. The Root, an online magazine focusing on African American culture, used to be held by The Slate Group until Graham Holdings sold it to Univision Communications in 2015. Graham Holdings Company also owns SocialCode, an advertising agency specializing in social media/ID-based marketing, and Panoply, a podcasting network.

In November 2014, Graham Holdings Company acquired Social News Desk, a social media management platform for newsrooms, through its subsidiary, Graham Media Group.

In June 2021, Graham Holdings acquired Leaf Group, a consumer internet company that runs both online consumer-orientated brands and marketplace brands.

Health care
In October 2012, the firm purchased Celtic Healthcare Inc. for an undisclosed sum. Celtic Healthcare, based in Pennsylvania, provides home health care in western, central, and northeastern Pennsylvania as well as Montgomery and Baltimore County, Maryland. It also provides home hospice services in the same areas, as well as owns a 10-bed inpatient hospice in Dunmore, Pennsylvania. In 2014, it had around 558 full-time and 45 part-time employees.

In 2014, Graham Holdings bought a majority stake in Troy, Michigan-based Residential Healthcare Group, the parent company of Residential Home Health and Residential Hospice, which provides at-home and on-site health care and hospice services in Michigan and Illinois.

Energy production
In July 2013, Graham Holdings purchased Forney Corp. for an undisclosed sum. The company, which is based in Addison, Texas, manufactures equipment that monitors and controls the combustion of coal, natural gas, and other materials. This equipment is sold to electric utilities for use in power generation plants.

Manufacturing
In June 2014, Graham Holdings acquired Joyce/Dayton Corp., a Dayton, Ohio-based manufacturer of screw jacks and other linear-motion systems.

In November 2015, Graham Holdings acquired Group Dekko, a Garrett, Indiana-based  electrical manufacturer.

In April 2017, Graham Holdings acquired Hoover Treated Wood Products, a Thompson, Georgia-based manufacturer of fire retardant wood and other wood products.

In May 2020, Graham Holdings announced that it had acquired Framebridge.

Restaurants
In July 2019, Graham Holdings acquired Clyde's Restaurant Group, the owner and operator of several restaurants in the Washington metropolitan area, including Old Ebbitt Grill.

Automotive
In January 2019, Graham Holdings acquired 90% of two automobile dealerships from Sonic Automotive. The company's latest acquisition — its fourth auto dealership to date — is located at 8820 Centreville Road in Manassas. Christopher J. Ourisman of Ourisman Automotive will operate and manage the dealership, which the Arlington holding company purchased from the Battlefield Automotive Group. Terms of the deal were not disclosed.

Education
Kaplan focuses on three areas: higher education, professional training, and test preparation.

In January 2016, Graham Holdings launched CyberVista, a cybersecurity training and education company.

Following several years of significant enrollment decline, Graham sold Kaplan University to the Purdue University system for one dollar in March 2018, which was rebranded as Purdue University Global. In exchange, Purdue agreed to employ Kaplan, Inc. as the exclusive provider of nonacademic functions, and Kaplan, Inc. agreed to assume responsibility for liabilities resulting before the transaction. According to the contract terms, Kaplan receives 12.5 percent of the university's revenue, as long as funds are available after all operating expenses and guaranteed payments to Purdue have been covered. Purdue University Global reported an $18 million loss in 2018, and a $43 million loss in 2019.

In February 2020, GHC reported that Purdue University Global owed Kaplan Higher Education $68.4 million for services and deferred fees and $18.6 million for an advance from the Kaplan University transaction. Despite spending a reported $132 million in marketing, more than $4,400 per enrolled student, and four times their competitor SNHU, enrollments at Global have remained virtually flat. In October 2020, Purdue University Global reported -$47 million in net assets, with a net operating loss of $103 million.

See also
 Lists of corporate assets

References

External links
 

American companies established in 1889
Holding companies established in 1889
Mass media companies established in 1889
Magazine publishing companies of the United States
Berkshire Hathaway
Companies listed on the New York Stock Exchange
The Washington Post
Mass media companies based in Washington, D.C.
1889 establishments in Washington, D.C.
Conglomerate companies of the United States